Wagenmakers is a surname. Notable people with this surname include:

Eric-Jan Wagenmakers (born 1972), Dutch psychologist
Linda Wagenmakers (born 1975), Dutch singer and voice actress